Lingenfeld is a Verbandsgemeinde ("collective municipality") in the district of Germersheim, Rhineland-Palatinate, Germany. The seat of the Verbandsgemeinde is in Lingenfeld.

The Verbandsgemeinde Lingenfeld consists of the following Ortsgemeinden ("local municipalities"):

*seat of the Verbandsgemeinde

References

Verbandsgemeinde in Rhineland-Palatinate